Victor Ferraz Macedo (born 14 January 1988) is a Brazilian footballer who plays as right back for Náutico.

Club career

Early career
Born in João Pessoa, Paraíba, Ferraz made his senior debuts with Iraty in 2008. In the following year he moved to São José-RS, and played for Águia de Marabá in 2010.

Atlético Goianiense / Vila Nova
In May 2010 Ferraz joined Campeonato Brasileiro Série A side Atlético Goianiense. He made his division debut on 8 August, starting in a 0–0 away draw against Ceará.

Ferraz scored his first Série A goal on 22 August, in a 1–1 away draw against Internacional. He was released by Atlético in July 2011, and subsequently joined Vila Nova.

Bragantino / Coritiba 
On 5 January 2012, Ferraz joined Bragantino. In August he moved to Coritiba; initially as a backup to Ayrton, he appeared regularly during the remainder of the campaign, and was also an ever-present figure in the following year.

Santos
On 24 June 2014, Ferraz signed a one and a half-year deal with Santos. He made his debut for the club on 17 July, starting in a 2–0 home win over Palmeiras.

In 2015, Ferraz was one of the most used players by Peixe, and after the departure of Cicinho, was assigned the  4 shirt. On 18 August he scored his first goal for the club, netting the game's only through a direct free kick in a 1–0 home success over Vasco.

On 3 August 2016, Ferraz completed his 100th game for the club, starting in a 0–0 home draw against Flamengo. He made his Copa Libertadores debut on 9 March of the following year, starting in a 1–1 away draw against Sporting Cristal.

On 9 March 2018, Ferraz extended his contract until 2020. For the 2019 campaign, he became team captain after the departure of David Braz and the retirement of Renato.

Grêmio
On 14 December 2019, Ferraz moved to fellow top tier side Grêmio on a two-year deal, with Madson moving in the opposite direction.

Personal life
Victor Ferraz is a devout Evangelical Christian, being the child of missionary parents of the Assembleias de Deus church.

Career statistics

Honours

Club
Atlético Goianiense
Campeonato Goiano: 2011

Coritiba
Campeonato Paranaense: 2013

Santos
Campeonato Paulista: 2015, 2016

Grêmio
Campeonato Gaúcho: 2020, 2021
Recopa Gaúcha: 2021

Individual
Campeonato Paulista Team of the Year: 2019

References

External links
 

1988 births
Living people
People from João Pessoa, Paraíba
Brazilian footballers
Brazilian evangelicals
Association football defenders
Campeonato Brasileiro Série A players
Campeonato Brasileiro Série B players
Campeonato Brasileiro Série D players
Iraty Sport Club players
Esporte Clube São José players
Águia de Marabá Futebol Clube players
Atlético Clube Goianiense players
Vila Nova Futebol Clube players
Clube Atlético Bragantino players
Coritiba Foot Ball Club players
Santos FC players
Grêmio Foot-Ball Porto Alegrense players
Clube Náutico Capibaribe players
Sportspeople from Paraíba